Tersonia is a genus of flowering plants in the family Gyrostemonaceae. 

It is endemic to Western Australia.

Known species
 Tersonia cyathiflora , also known as button creeper.
 Tersonia brevipes , published in 1849,

They all have a syncarps.

Taxonomy
The genus name of Tersonia is in honour of Joséphine Louise Moquin-Tandon, born de Terson (1819–1890), wife of the French botanist Alfred Moquin-Tandon (Moq), the author of this genus. It was first described and published in Prodr. Vol.13 (Issue 2) on page 40 in 1849.

References

Gyrostemonaceae
Brassicales genera
Rosids of Western Australia
Plants described in 1849